Platytainia is a genus of parasitic flies in the family Tachinidae. There are at least two described species in Platytainia.

Species
Platytainia maculata Macquart, 1851
Platytainia moorei Barraclough, 1992

References

Dexiinae
Diptera of Australasia
Taxa named by Pierre-Justin-Marie Macquart
Tachinidae genera